Arrhenopeplus is a genus of beetles belonging to the family Staphylinidae.

The genus was first described by Koch in 1937.

Species:
 Arrhenopeplus tesserula

References

Staphylinidae
Staphylinidae genera